The 1946 Currie Cup was the 21st edition of the Currie Cup, the premier domestic rugby union competition in South Africa.

Tables

Northern Section

Southern Section

Interdivisional Fixtures and Results

Final

See also

 Currie Cup

References

1946
1946 in South African rugby union
Currie